Avoine Olympique Chinon Cinais (until 2010 Union Sportive Électrique Avoine) is a French association football club founded in 1963. They are based in the town of Avoine, Indre-et-Loire and their home stadium is the Stade Marcel Vignaud. Since the 2017–18 season, the club plays in the Championnat National 3, the fifth tier of French football. In 2013 they adopted their current name after a merger with FC Chinon.

Current squad

References

External links
Avoine OCC club information at fff.fr 
 

Football clubs in France
Association football clubs established in 1963
1963 establishments in France
Sport in Indre-et-Loire
Football clubs in Centre-Val de Loire